The Copa América Femenina de Futsal, also known as the Sudamericano de Futsal Femenino (South American Women's Futsal Championship), is the women's version of Copa América de Futsal.

Results

Medal summary

References

 https://web.archive.org/web/20170312195011/http://www.futsalplanet.com/agenda/agenda-01.asp?id=11475

External links
CONMEBOL site
IV Conmebol Women Futsal Championships

 
Futsal competitions in South America
CONMEBOL competitions for women's national teams
Women's international futsal competitions